George Wallace Gouinlock (August 1, 1861 – February 13, 1932) was a prominent Canadian architect. Gouinlock practiced mostly in Toronto, Ontario, Canada, including several designated buildings at Exhibition Place.

His son George Roper Gouinlock (18961979) also practised architecture. Son Robert Watson Gouinlock (1892-1966) was a Captain with the Canadian Engineers and served in World War I. Robert was a civil engineer.

Biography
Gouinlock was born in 1861 in Paris, Ontario to Walter and Elizabeth Gouinlock. Gouinlock trained in various cities (including Hamilton, Chicago and Milwaukee) towards becoming an architect. He later moved to Winnipeg, Manitoba as a junior architect with Barber, Bowes & Barber. He came back to Toronto in 1888 and began a partnership with architect Francis S. Baker (as Gouinlock & Baker) from 1888 to 1890.

The bulk of Gouinlock's work was in Toronto. In 1895, he was Chair of the Toronto Society of Architects and President of the Ontario Association of Architects in 1909. Gouinlock retired in 1927.

Gouinlock married Georgina Watson in 1889 and had two sons George Roper and Robert Watson, and a daughter, Laura Huntington (1890-1982)

Gouinlock died on February 13, 1932, and is buried at Mount Pleasant Cemetery in Toronto.

George Roper Gouinlock 

George Wallace's son George Roper Gouinlock (1896-1979) was also an architect, whom with Hugh L. Allward (1899-1971) formed the Allward and Gouinlock partnership in 1935. Allward was the son of sculptor Walter Allward and great-grandfather of Port Perry based landscape architect Hugh Allward. Hugh Allward was succeeded by his nephew Peter L. Allward.

Projects

George Wallace Gouinlock projects 

Many of Gouinlock's buildings were Beaux-Arts. His works also feature other architectural styles. Many buildings at Exhibition Place were designed by Gouinlock:

 Press Building, 210 Princes' Boulevard 1905 (Beaux-Arts)
 Music Building, 285 Manitoba Drive 1907 (Beaux-Arts) - formerly  Railway Building
 CNE Grandstand 1907, destroyed by fire 1947 and rebuilt as Exhibition Stadium 1948 
 Horticulture Building, 15 Saskatchewan Road 1907 (Beaux-Arts)
 CNE Fire Hall and Police Station, 90 Quebec Street 1912 - (Tudor Revival)
 CNE Government Building 1912 (Beaux-Arts), 10 Dufferin Street - now Medieval Times Building, formerly Government Building and Arts, Crafts and Hobbies Building

Other works across Toronto and beyond included:

 semi detached dwellings at 117-119 Collier Street 1891
 Charles Steinle Meat Packing Company, 256 King Street East 1892 (Richardson Romanesque) 
 American Watch Case Company, 511 King Street West 1893 (demolished 2020 with only façade retained)
 Temple Building, Toronto, Bay and Richmond 1895 (Romanesque Revival) - demolished 1970
 Manitoba Trust Company Building, Winnipeg (Main Street and Pioneer Street) 1899-1900 - with George Creeford Browne and demolished 1974
 Town Hall, St. Marys, Ontario 1901 (Romanesque Revival)
 Bank of Hamilton, 165 Spadina Avenue 1902 - now CIBC branch
 Marshall McLuhan’s House (Sir W.T. White House) and Coach House, 39 and 39a Queen's Park Crescent 1903,
 Consumer's Gas Company addition, 23 Toronto Street 1904
 Warwick Bros. and Rutter Publishers, 401 King Street West 1905
 Sovereign Bank, 172 King Street East 1907
 Broadview Hotel renovation 1907
 Canadian Birkbeck Savings and Investment Company Head Office, 10 Adelaide Street East, Toronto 1908 (Edwardian) - now Ontario Heritage Centre
 William Peyton Hubbard House, 660 Broadview Avenue 1909
 Ontario Legislative Building North Wing, 1 Queen's Park Crescent 1909
 MacLean Building, 345 Adelaide Street West 1914
 Princess Margaret Hospital - South Building, University Avenue 1915 - formerly Ontario Hydro-Electric Building
 Art Gallery of Toronto conceptual drawings
 Alexandra Palace, Toronto - demolished

George Roper Gouinlock projects

 Scarborough High School (1922, partially demolished in 1976) - with Burden and Harold Carter
 Kapuskasing Inn (1927)
 Sensenbrenner Hospital (1927-1929)
 Vaughan Road High School - later as Vaughan Road Academy (1927)
 East York High School - now East York Collegiate Institute (1927 - façade remains after 1986)
 R.H. McGregor Public School - now R.H. McGregor ES (1928 - demolished)
 Newmarket High School (1928)
 Bowmanville High School (1929)
 Daisy Avenue Public School 1929 (Collegiate Gothic) -  renamed Vincent Massey Junior School (1964) and Vincent Massey Academy (1985)
 Brockville Collegiate Institute (1929–30)
 Long Branch Public School - now James S. Bell Junior Middle School (1930–31)
 Kapuskasing High School - now Kapuskasing District High School (1932)

Allward and Gouinlock projects 

 1932 - Eaton Hall, King City
 1946 Glen Park Public School  Toronto - replaced by new school building opened in 1998
 1949 - East and West Memorial Buildings, Ottawa
 1959 - David and Mary Thomson Collegiate Institute, Scarborough (Lawrence Avenue East); demolished 2020
 1961 - Cedarbrae Collegiate Institute, Scarborough
 1961 - R.H. King Collegiate Institute, Scarborough - western addition
 1962 - York University Field House, Toronto
 1965 - Sir Wilfrid Laurier Collegiate Institute, Scarborough
 1966 - West Humber Collegiate Institute, Etobicoke
 1965-1968 - McLaughlin Planetarium, Toronto

References

External links

 Archival papers of Allward & Gouinlock Architects Inc. (son George Roper Gouinlock's firm) held at the University of Toronto Archives and Records Management Services

1861 births
1932 deaths
Canadian architects
People from the County of Brant